Mashteuiatsh is a First Nations reserve in the Saguenay–Lac-Saint-Jean region of Quebec, Canada, about  north from the centre of Roberval. It is the home to the Pekuakamiulnuatsh First Nation. It is located on a headland jutting out on the western shores of Lake Saint-Jean known as Pointe-Bleue, in the geographic township of Ouiatchouan, and belongs to the Montagnais du Lac St-Jean Innu band. It is geographically within the Le Domaine-du-Roy Regional County Municipality but administratively not part of it.

Previously officially known as Ouiatchouan Reserve, it was renamed Mashteuiatsh in 1985, from Ka Mesta8iats, meaning "where there is a point" or "seeing one yet again at the point".

Mashteuiatsh is serviced by a health centre, community radio station, arena, library, community and sports centre, social services centre, municipal water and sewer system, fire station, and an aboriginal police force. The reserve is home to the Mashteuiatsh Amerindian Museum (Musée amérindien de Mashteuiatsh), which was founded in 1977 with a mission to preserve Innu cultural heritage.

Toponymy
Before becoming a reserve according to the Indian Act in 1856, Mashteuiatsh – which means “Where there is a point” – was already for the Ilnuatsh a sector of passage and frequented gathering. Initially called by the name of Ouiatchouan, the community has been called Mashteuiatsh since 1985. The popular name of Pointe-Bleue has long also designated the inhabited area of the reserve. The majority of the members of the Pekuakamiulnuatsh First Nation live in the Saguenay-Lac-Saint-Jean region, mainly in the community of Mashteuiatsh. It is inhabited by the Montagnais of Lac St-Jean.

Geography
The Indian Reserve of Mashteuiatsh is located at the junction of Roberval and Saint-Prime, on the shore of the Lac Saint-Jean in Saguenay–Lac-Saint-Jean, Quebec. It is linked to Roberval to the south via boulevard Horace-J.-Beemer.

History

Before Europeans arrived in the area, the site was a frequently used stopover place and camp of the indigenous Innu. Circa 1775, a trading post was established there, owned by English merchants Thomas Dunn and John Gray.

But because Pointe-Bleue had been their traditional site and because loggers would not respect the boundaries of the reserved lands, the Innu asked the Government of Canada to exchange these lands bordering the Peribonka and Métabetchouane Rivers for those in Ouiatchouan Township where Pointe-Bleue is.

In 1867, the Hudson's Bay Company established there its trading post. This gave the reserve some importance, attracting an Oblates' mission in 1875, and even resulting in the closure of the Métabetchouan Post in 1880. Nevertheless, the Innu showed no interest in permanent settlement. Furthermore, under insistent pressure by political and religious authorities who promoted the area's colonization by new settlers, the Innu ceded more than  back to the government in 1869, and another  in 1895.

In 1985 and 1986, the Lac St-Jean Innu began claiming for compensation and recovery of most of these lost lands. On February 28, 2000, a settlement agreement with the Government of Canada was signed.

Native American Museum  

The Mashteuiatsh Native Museum was built in 1977, and transmits the history and culture of the pekuakamiulnuatsh (Ilnus du lac-saint-Jean). It is possible to find knowledge on the Ilnuatsh, but also on the other First Nations of Quebec and America. In addition to its permanent exhibition, the Native American Museum offers three temporary exhibitions, as well as a visit to the Nutshimitsh outdoor garden (in the forest), artistic creation workshops and a boutique area. These activities are also available in the form of a guided tour, made by members of the community.

Demographics

As of 2022, the band counted 8,373 members, of which 2,104 persons are living in the community.

Population trend:
 Population in 2021: 2010 (2016 to 2021 population change: 2.7%)
 Population in 2016: 1957
 Population in 2011: 2213 
 Population in 2006: 1749
 Population in 2001: 1861
 Population in 1996: 1725
 Population in 1991: 1489

Private dwellings occupied by usual residents: 808 (total dwellings: 1,095)

Mother tongue:
 English as first language: 0.8%
 French as first language: 87.1%
 English and French as first language: 0.3%
 Other as first language: 9.5%

Economy
The local economy is based mostly on logging, construction, transport, and tourism. There are some 130 businesses on the reserve that provide services such as: food, hotel accommodations, sawmills, electrician, auto mechanics, taxi, arts and handicrafts, post office, excavation, plumbing, translation, camping, hardware, convenience store, restaurants.

Education
There are two schools on the reserve:
 École Amishk, providing pre-Kindergarten to elementary grade 6, with an enrolment of 247 students in 2008-2009
 École Kassinu-Mamu, providing secondary grade 1 to 5, with an enrolment of 230 students in 2008-2009

References

External links

Website of the village of Mashteuiatsh

Innu communities in Quebec
Communities in Saguenay–Lac-Saint-Jean
Hudson's Bay Company trading posts